Tariq Abdul-Wahad (born Olivier Michael Saint-Jean; November 3, 1974) is a French basketball coach and former player. As Olivier Saint-Jean, he played college basketball at Michigan and San Jose State. In 1997, the Sacramento Kings selected Saint-Jean in the first round of the NBA draft as the 11th overall pick, and Saint-Jean converted to Islam and changed his name to Tariq Abdul-Wahad. From 1997 to 2003, Abdul-Wahad played in the NBA for the Kings, Orlando Magic, Denver Nuggets, and Dallas Mavericks. He was the first player to be raised in France and play in the NBA.

Early life and college years
Olivier Saint-Jean was born in Maisons-Alfort near Paris. His mother George Goudet was a professional basketball player. His father Quinis Brower was a former Hofstra University and pro basketball player who was drafted by the ABA's New York Nets before a professional career in France, playing with the club team Limoges.

After graduating from Lycee Aristide Briand in 1993, Abdul-Wahad first played college basketball for two years at Michigan and transferred to San Jose State in 1995. Abdul-Wahad was part of the San Jose State team that won the 1996 Big West Conference men's basketball tournament and made the NCAA tournament despite a 13-16 record.

His No. 3 jersey was retired by San Jose State in 2002, however the banner hanging in the Event Center Arena refers to him as Olivier Saint-Jean, the name he used while in college. He changed his name to Tariq Abdul-Wahad after converting to Islam in 1997.

Professional career
Abdul-Wahad's peak year as a pro was with the Sacramento Kings in the lockout-shortened 1999 NBA season, when he was a starter for the team. They pushed the Utah Jazz to the brink of elimination but lost in the fifth and final game of the series.

He was known as a defensive specialist, but his playing time was restricted in later seasons due to injuries. He only played in 236 out of a possible 624 games between 1997 and 2005. In the whole 2003–04 and 2004–05 seasons Abdul-Wahad was on the Dallas Mavericks' roster on injured reserve, as he was permanently unable to play. He was released by Mavericks on 28 September 2005, during training camp prior to the 2005–06 season. In November 2006 Italian team Climamio Bologna invited Abdul-Wahad to a try out, but he was not signed.

NBA career statistics

Regular season 

|-
| align="left" | 1997–98
| align="left" | Sacramento
| 59 || 16 || 16.3 || .403 || .211 || .672 || 2.0 || .9 || .6 || .2 || 6.4
|-
| align="left" | 1998–99
| align="left" | Sacramento
| 49 || 49 || 24.6 || .435 || .286 || .691 || 3.8 || 1.0 || 1.0 || .3 || 9.3
|-
| align="left" | 1999–00
| align="left" | Orlando
| 46 || 46 || 26.2 || .433 || .095 || .762 || 5.2 || 1.6 || 1.2 || .3 || 12.2
|-
| align="left" | 1999–00
| align="left" | Denver
| 15 || 10 || 24.9 || .389 || .500 || .738 || 3.5 || 1.7 || .4 || .8 || 8.9
|-
| align="left" | 2000–01
| align="left" | Denver
| 29 || 12 || 14.5 || .387 || .400 || .583 || 2.0 || .8 || .5 || .4 || 3.8
|-
| align="left" | 2001–02
| align="left" | Denver
| 20 || 12 || 20.9 || .379 || .500 || .750 || 3.9 || 1.1 || .9 || .5 || 6.8
|-
| align="left" | 2001–02
| align="left" | Dallas
| 4 || 0 || 6.0 || .000 || – || .000 || 1.5 || .5 || .5 || .3 || .0
|-
| align="left" | 2002–03
| align="left" | Dallas
| 14 || 0 || 14.6 || .466 || .000 || .500 || 2.9 || 1.5 || .4 || .2 || 4.1
|- class="sortbottom"
| style="text-align:center;" colspan="2"| Career
| 236 || 145 || 20.4 || .417 || .237 || .703 || 3.3 || 1.1 || .8 || .4 || 7.8
|}

Playoffs 

|-
| align="left" | 1999
| align="left" | Sacramento
| 5 || 5 || 19.8 || .455 || .000 || .813 || 3.8 || .8 || .8 || .8 || 8.6
|-
| align="left" | 2003
| align="left" | Dallas
| 8 || 0 || 9.9 || .300 || .000 || .875 || 2.8 || .9 || .0 || .0 || 3.1
|- class="sortbottom"
| style="text-align:center;" colspan="2"| Career
| 13 || 5 || 13.7 || .381 || .000 || .833 || 3.2 || .8 || .3 || .3 || 5.2
|}

National team career
Abdul-Wahad (as Oliver Saint Jean) played for the France men's national under-18 basketball team at the 1992 FIBA Europe Under-18 Championship where his team won gold.

Post-playing years
In 2005, Abdul-Wahad played the part of King Negus of Abyssinia (Ethiopia) in the video play Mercy to Mankind: Part 1, The Prophecy Fulfilled, sponsored by the MAS (Muslim American Society) Youth Chapter, Dallas, Texas.

Abdul-Wahad  finished his B.A. in art history at San Jose State University in 2008 and enrolled in the M.A. program at San Jose State afterwards.  He later started a clothing business in Brazil with a friend and a television production company in France.

On July 21, 2011, the Division II Cal State Monterey Bay Otters women's basketball team hired Abdul-Wahad as an assistant coach.

Abdul-Wahad became head varsity boys' basketball coach at Lincoln High School of San Jose, California in 2012.

Notes

External links
NBA bio
Complete stats @ basketball-reference.com
fiba.com Profile

1974 births
Living people
American women's basketball coaches
Basketball coaches from California
Black French sportspeople
Cal State Monterey Bay Otters
Converts to Islam
Dallas Mavericks players
Denver Nuggets players
French expatriate basketball people in the United States
French Guianan basketball players
French men's basketball players
French Muslims
French people of French Guianan descent
High school basketball coaches in California
Michigan Wolverines men's basketball players
National Basketball Association players from France
Orlando Magic players
People from Maisons-Alfort
Sacramento Kings draft picks
Sacramento Kings players
San Jose State Spartans men's basketball players
Shooting guards
Small forwards
Sportspeople from Évreux
Sportspeople from Val-de-Marne